Petra Martić defeated Olga Danilović in the final, 6–4, 6–2 to win the singles tennis title at the 2022 Ladies Open Lausanne. It was Martić's first WTA title since Istanbul in 2019.

Tamara Zidanšek was the defending champion, but was defeated in the first round by Anna Kalinskaya.

Seeds

Draw

Finals

Top half

Bottom half

Qualifying

Seeds

Qualifiers

Qualifying draw

First qualifier

Second qualifier

Third qualifier

Fourth qualifier

Fifth qualifier

Sixth qualifier

References

Citations

General  
 Main draw
 Qualifying draw

2022 WTA Tour
2022 Ladies Open Lausanne - 1